The .450 Bushmaster is a rifle cartridge developed by Tim LeGendre of LeMag Firearms, and licensed to Bushmaster Firearms International. The .450 Bushmaster is designed to be used in standard M16s and AR-15s, using modified magazines and upper receiver  assemblies.

History
The .450 Bushmaster is descended from the Thumper concept popularized by the gun writer Jeff Cooper. Cooper was dissatisfied with the small-diameter 5.56×45mm NATO (.223 Remington) of the AR-15, and envisioned a need for a large bore (.44 cal or greater) cartridge in a semi-automatic rifle to provide one-shot kills on big-game animals at 250 yards. Inspired by this, LeGendre developed his .45 Professional cartridge, and later built and delivered an AR-15 in .45 Professional to Cooper.

Bushmaster requested the ammunition manufacturer Hornady to produce the .45 Professional cartridge for this project, but Hornady wanted to shorten the cartridge case and overall length to accommodate their 0.452 in. 250-grain pointed SST flex-tip bullet. Bushmaster and LeGendre approved the change from a 1.772 in. (45 mm) case and 2.362 in. (60 mm) OAL to the now standard 1.700 in. (43.18 mm) case and 2.260 in. (57.40 mm) OAL. This permitted operation in the more abundant and popular AR-15 platform versus the AR-10 platform. Also, a name change to ".450 Bushmaster" was approved.

Loadings and ballistics

The .450 Bushmaster makes use of .452 in. bullets because the lower impact velocities and energies would not adequately expand the heavier jacketed .458 in. bullets. The cartridge is chambered in bolt-action rifles by Ruger, Savage, Mossberg, and Remington, Ruger's No. 1 single shot rifle, AR-15 rifles, as well as an AR-15 pistol by Franklin Armory.

Ballistically, the .450 Bushmaster has a rather flat trajectory out to 200 yards; if the firearm is zeroed at 150 yards, the user can expect to see a rise of 1.8 inches at 100 yards, zero at 150 yards, and a drop of 4.9 inches at 200 yards. The cartridge fits single-stacked in a standard AR-15 magazine with a single-stack follower. A 10-round AR-15 magazine body yields a four-round  magazine, a 20-round AR-15 magazine body yields a five- to seven-round  magazine, and a 30-round body yields a nine-round  magazine. Hornady, Remington and Federal now manufacture ammunition for the rifle, and Starline manufactures empty brass for handloading.

See also
List of AR platform cartridges
List of rifle cartridges
Table of handgun and rifle cartridges
11 mm caliber
.444 Marlin
.45-70
.458 SOCOM
.460 S&W Magnum
.50 Beowulf
12.7×55mm STs-130

References

External links
Hornady Manufacturing - 450 Bushmaster (Archived 2009-08-05)
Bushmaster .450 Rifle & Carbine - Bushmaster Firearms (Archived 2009-08-05)
Hornady Manufacturing Company :: Ammunition :: Rifle :: Choose by Caliber :: 450 Bushmaster :: 450 Bushmaster 250 gr FTX LEVERevolution

Pistol and rifle cartridges
Bushmaster firearms